The Starling Principle holds that extracellular fluid movements between blood and tissues are determined by differences in hydrostatic pressure and colloid osmotic (oncotic) pressure between plasma inside microvessels and interstitial fluid outside them. The Starling Equation, proposed many years after the death of Starling, describes that relationship in mathematical form and can be applied to many biological and non-biological semipermeable membranes. The classic Starling principle and the equation that describes it have in recent years been revised and extended.

Every day around 8 litres of water (solvent) containing a variety of small molecules (solutes) leaves the blood stream of an adult human and perfuses the cells of the various body tissues. Interstitial fluid drains by afferent lymph vessels to one of the regional lymph node groups, where around 4 litres per day is reabsorbed to the blood stream. The remainder of the lymphatic fluid is rich in proteins and other large molecules and rejoins the blood stream via the thoracic duct which empties into the great veins close to the heart. Filtration from plasma to interstitial (or tissue) fluid occurs in microvascular capillaries and post-capillary venules. In most tissues the micro vessels are invested with a continuous internal surface layer that includes a fibre matrix now known as the endothelial glycocalyx whose interpolymer spaces function as a system of small pores, radius circa 5 nm. Where the endothelial glycocalyx overlies a gap in the junction molecules that bind endothelial cells together (inter endothelial cell cleft), the plasma ultrafiltrate may pass to the interstitial space, leaving larger molecules reflected back into the plasma. 

A small number of continuous capillaries are specialised to absorb solvent and solutes from interstitial fluid back into the blood stream through fenestrations in endothelial cells, but the volume of solvent absorbed every day is small.

Discontinuous capillaries as found in sinusoidal tissues of bone marrow, liver and spleen have little or no filter function.

The rate at which fluid is filtered across vascular endothelium (transendothelial filtration) is determined by the sum of two outward forces, capillary pressure and interstitial protein osmotic pressure, and two absorptive forces, plasma protein osmotic pressure and interstitial pressure. The Starling equation describes these forces in mathematical terms. It is one of the Kedem–Katchalski equations which bring nonsteady state thermodynamics to the theory of osmotic pressure across membranes that are at least partly permeable to the solute responsible for the osmotic pressure difference. The second Kedem–Katchalsky equation explains the trans endothelial transport of solutes, .

The equation

The classic Starling equation reads as follows:

where:
  is the trans endothelial solvent filtration volume per second (SI units of m3·s−1).
  is the net driving force (SI units of Pa = kg·m−1·s−2, often expressed as mmHg),
  is the capillary hydrostatic pressure
  is the interstitial hydrostatic pressure
  is the plasma protein oncotic pressure
  is the interstitial oncotic pressure
  is the hydraulic conductivity of the membrane (SI units of m2·s·kg−1, equivalent to m·s−1·mmHg−1)
  is the surface area for filtration (SI units of m2)
 the product · is defined as the filtration coefficient (SI units of m4·s·kg−1, or equivalently in m3·s−1·mmHg−1)
  is Staverman's reflection coefficient (adimensional)

By convention, outward force is defined as positive, and inward force is defined as negative. If Jv is positive, solvent is leaving the capillary (filtration). If negative, solvent is entering the capillary (absorption).

Applying the classic Starling equation, it had long been taught that continuous capillaries filter out fluid in their arteriolar section and reabsorb most of it in their venular section, as shown by the diagram.

However, empirical evidence shows that, in most tissues, the flux of the intraluminal fluid of capillaries is continuous and, primarily, effluent.  Efflux occurs along the whole length of a capillary. Fluid filtered to the space outside a capillary is mostly returned to the circulation via lymph nodes and the thoracic duct.

A mechanism for this phenomenon is the Michel-Weinbaum model, in honour of two scientists who, independently, described the filtration function of the glycocalyx. Briefly, the  colloid osmotic pressure πi of the interstitial fluid has been found to have no effect on Jv and the colloid osmotic pressure difference that opposes filtration is now known to be π'p minus the subglycocalyx π, which is close to zero while there is adequate filtration to flush interstitial proteins out of the interendothelial cleft. Consequently, Jv is much less than previously calculated, and the unopposed diffusion of interstitial proteins to the subglycocalyx space if and when filtration falls wipes out the colloid osmotic pressure difference necessary for reabsorption of fluid to the capillary.

The revised Starling equation is compatible with the steady-state Starling principle:

where:
  is the trans endothelial solvent filtration volume per second.
  is the net driving force,
  is the capillary hydrostatic pressure
  is the interstitial hydrostatic pressure
  is the plasma protein oncotic pressure
  is the subglycocalyx oncotic pressure
  is the hydraulic conductivity of the membrane
  is the surface area for filtration
  is Staverman's reflection coefficient

Pressures are often measured in millimetres of mercury (mmHg), and the filtration coefficient in millilitres per minute per millimetre of mercury (ml·min−1·mmHg−1).

Filtration coefficient

In some texts the product of hydraulic conductivity and surface area is called the filtration co-efficient Kfc.

Reflection coefficient
Staverman's reflection coefficient, σ, is a unitless constant that is specific to the permeability of a membrane to a given solute.

The Starling equation, written without σ, describes the flow of a solvent across a membrane that is impermeable to the solutes contained within the solution.

σn corrects for the partial permeability of a semipermeable membrane to a solute n.

Where σ is close to 1, the plasma membrane is less permeable to the denotated species (for example, larger molecules such as albumin and other plasma proteins), which may flow across the endothelial lining, from higher to lower concentrations, more slowly, while allowing water and smaller solutes through the glycocalyx filter to the extravascular space.
 Glomerular capillaries have a reflection coefficient close to 1 as normally no protein crosses into the glomerular filtrate.
 In contrast, hepatic sinusoids have no reflection coefficient as they are fully permeable to protein. Hepatic interstitial fluid within the Space of Diss has the same colloid osmotic pressure as plasma and so hepatocyte synthesis of albumin can be regulated.  Albumin and other proteins in the interstitial spaces return to the circulation via lymph.

Approximated values
Following are typically quoted values for the variables in the classic Starling equation:

It is reasoned that some albumin escapes from the capillaries and enters the interstitial fluid where it would produce a flow of water equivalent to that produced by a hydrostatic pressure of +3 mmHg. Thus, the difference in protein concentration would produce a flow of fluid into the vessel at the venous end equivalent to 28 − 3 = 25 mmHg of hydrostatic pressure. The total oncotic pressure present at the venous end could be considered as +25 mmHg.

In the beginning (arteriolar end) of a capillary, there is a net driving force outwards from the capillary of +9 mmHg. In the end (venular end), on the other hand, there is a net driving force of −8 mmHg.

Assuming that the net driving force declines linearly, then there is a mean net driving force outwards from the capillary as a whole, which also results in that more fluid exits a capillary than re-enters it. The lymphatic system drains this excess.

J. Rodney Levick argues in his textbook that the interstitial force is often underestimated, and measurements used to populate the revised Starling equation show the absorbing forces to be consistently less than capillary or venular pressures.

Specific organs

Kidneys 
Glomerular capillaries have a continuous glycocalyx layer in health and the total transendothelial filtration rate of solvent to the renal tubules is normally around 125 ml/ min (about 180 litres/ day). Glomerular capillary  is more familiarly known as the glomerular filtration rate (GFR). In the rest of the body's capillaries,   is typically 5 ml/ min (around 8 litres/ day), and the fluid is returned to the circulation via afferent and efferent lymphatics.

Lungs 
The Starling equation can describe the movement of fluid from pulmonary capillaries to the alveolar air space.

Clinical significance

Woodcock and Woodcock showed in 2012 that the revised Starling equation (steady-state Starling principle) provides scientific explanations for clinical observations concerning intravenous fluid therapy. Traditional teaching of both filtration and absorption of fluid occurring in a single capillary has been superseded by the concept of a vital circulation of extracellular fluid running parallel to the circulation of blood. New approaches to the treatment of oedema (tissue swelling) are suggested.

History 
The Starling equation is named for the British physiologist Ernest Starling, who is also recognised for the Frank–Starling law of the heart. Starling can be credited with identifying that the "absorption of isotonic salt solutions (from the extravascular space) by the blood vessels is determined by this osmotic pressure of the serum proteins" in 1896.

See also
 Renal function

References

External links
 Derangedphysiology.com: Starling's Principle of Transvascular Fluid Dynamics Starling's principle of transvascular fluid dynamics | Deranged Physiology

Equations of fluid dynamics
Cardiovascular physiology
Mathematics in medicine